The Common Affordable Lightweight Fighter (CALF) was a joint DARPA and United States Navy project that ran from 1993 to 1994. Its aims were to harmonize requirements for a common aircraft that would meet the VSTOL needs of the United States Marine Corps and the Royal Navy; while at the same time providing a common low-cost, low-maintenance fighter platform for the United States Air Force, the United States Navy and foreign customers. The program was created at the suggestion of Lockheed with participation from McDonnell Douglas, and after a year of technology validation it was merged into what would become the Joint Strike Fighter program.

References

Lockheed Martin F-35 Lightning II
Military aircraft procurement programs of the United States